{{DISPLAYTITLE:C16H10N2O2}}
The molecular formula C16H10N2O2 (molar mass: 262.27 g/mol, exact mass: 262.0742 u) may refer to:

 Indigo dye
 Indirubin

Molecular formulas